FK Stupava (until 2013 as FK Tatran Stupava) was a Slovak football team, based in the town of Stupava, Malacky District. The club was founded in 1921.

References

External links 
  

Defunct football clubs in Slovakia
Sport in Bratislava Region
Association football clubs established in 1921
Association football clubs disestablished in 2016
1921 establishments in Slovakia